Almir Hurtić (born 28 September 1971) is a Bosnian professional football manager and former player who was most recently manager of Bosnian Premier League club Sarajevo.

Before Sarajevo, he also managed Azerbaijan Premier League club Mughan from 2009 until 2010.

Honours

Player
Sarajevo
First League of Bosnia and Herzegovina: 1998–99
Bosnian Cup: 1997–98
Bosnian Supercup: 1997

References

External links

1971 births
Living people
People from Doboj
Association football goalkeepers
Bosnia and Herzegovina footballers
FK Željezničar Sarajevo players
FK Sarajevo players
Premier League of Bosnia and Herzegovina players
Bosnia and Herzegovina football managers
FK Mughan managers
FK Sarajevo managers
Premier League of Bosnia and Herzegovina managers
Bosnia and Herzegovina expatriate football managers
Expatriate football managers in Azerbaijan
Bosnia and Herzegovina expatriate sportspeople in Azerbaijan